Vonnie Cile McLoyd is an American developmental psychologist known for her research on how poverty, parental job loss, unemployment, and work characteristics affect children's social emotional development. She is the Ewart A. C. Thomas Collegiate Professor of Psychology at the University of Michigan.

McLoyd was a 1996 recipient of a MacArthur Fellowship, in recognition of her work on the "interactive influences of race, ethnicity, family, and economic hardship on human development."

Life
McLoyd completed her undergraduate degree at Talladega College (1971) and her M.A. (1973) and Ph.D. (1975) at the University of Michigan. Her dissertation titled The Effects of Verbal Reinforcement and Induced Perceptions of Causality on Intrinsic Motivation was supervised by Joseph Veroff.

McLoyd joined the faculty at the University of Michigan in 1978. From 2002–2010, she was faculty at University of North Carolina, Chapel Hill before returning to University of Michigan.

She was associate editor of the journals Child Development(1993-1996) and American Psychologist (2006-2016).

Works

References

External links
Faculty homepage at the University of Michigan
Vonnie C. McLoyd publications indexed by Google Scholar

Year of birth missing (living people)
Living people
MacArthur Fellows
21st-century American psychologists
Talladega College alumni
University of Michigan alumni
University of Massachusetts faculty
University of Michigan faculty
University of North Carolina at Chapel Hill faculty